Vachellia nilotica subsp. tomentosa is a perennial tree native to Africa, Asia and India.

Uses

Tannin
The pods without seeds of V. nilotica subsp. tomentosa have a tannin content of about 50%.

References

nilotica subsp. tomentosa
Plant subspecies